Esmir Bajraktarevic (born March 10, 2005) is an American professional soccer player who plays as a winger for Major League Soccer club New England Revolution.

Personal life
Born in the United States, Bajraktarević is of Bosnian descent.

References

2005 births
Living people
American soccer players
Soccer players from Wisconsin
Sportspeople from Appleton, Wisconsin
Association football midfielders
New England Revolution II players
New England Revolution players
USL League One players
American people of Bosnia and Herzegovina descent
American people of Bosniak descent
American Muslims
MLS Next Pro players
Homegrown Players (MLS)
Major League Soccer players